The 2023 World Series of Darts is a series of televised darts tournaments organised by the Professional Darts Corporation. In 2023, there are set to be 5 World Series events and one finals event, which as the previous year, will take place in Amsterdam, Netherlands.

Included in the schedule is a return to the Middle East for the first time since the 2017 Dubai Duty Free Darts Masters, with the announcement of the Bahrain Darts Masters to be held at the Bahrain International Circuit, Sakhir in January 2023.

Prize money
The prize money is expected to remain the same for 2023.

World Series events

References

World Series of Darts

World Series